Split Coconut is an album by Dave Mason, released in October 1975. It was reissued on CD on the One Way label in 1995.

Reception

Allmusic's brief retrospective review called the album a major disappointment after Mason's first two albums for Columbia, claiming that the songs seem both hastily written and hastily recorded.

Track listing 
All songs by Dave Mason unless otherwise noted.

Side One
 "Split Coconut"
 "Crying, Waiting, Hoping" (Buddy Holly)
 "You Can Lose It" (Dave Mason, Jim Krueger)
 "She's a Friend"
 "Save Your Love"
Side Two
 "Give Me a Reason Why"
 "Two Guitar Lovers" (Maureen Grey)
 "Sweet Music"
 "Long Lost Friend"

Personnel
Dave Mason – vocals, guitar, slide guitar
Jim Krueger – guitar
Graham Nash – guitar, background vocals
Gerald Johnson – bass
Mark T. Jordan – organ, keyboards, clavinet
Jai Winding – organ, synthesizer, piano, keyboards
Rick Jaeger – drums 
Emil Richards – percussion, marimba
The Manhattan Transfer – vocals, background vocals
David Crosby – vocals, background vocals

Chart positions

References

1975 albums
Dave Mason albums
Albums produced by Dave Mason
Albums produced by Bruce Botnick
Columbia Records albums